The 1967 NCAA College Division football season was the 12th season of college football in the United States organized by the National Collegiate Athletic Association at the NCAA College Division level.

Conference standings

Rankings

College Division teams (also referred to as "small college") were ranked in polls by the AP (a panel of writers) and by UPI (coaches). The national champion(s) for each season were determined by the final poll rankings, published at or near the end of the regular season, before any bowl games were played.

College Division final polls
In 1967, both services ranked San Diego State first and North Dakota State second.

Associated Press (writers) final poll
Published on November 24

Denotes team lost a game after AP poll, hence record differs in UPI poll

United Press International (coaches) final poll
Published on November 30

Bowl games
The postseason consisted of four bowl games as regional finals; Mideast and West played on December 9, while East and Midwest played on December 16.

In 1968, the Boardwalk Bowl succeeded the Tangerine Bowl, and the Pecan Bowl moved within Texas, from Abilene to Arlington.

See also
 1967 NCAA University Division football season
 1967 NAIA football season

References